Maurice Ménardeau (6 February 1897 – 11 April 1977) was a French painter. His work was part of the painting event in the art competition at the 1928 Summer Olympics.

References

1897 births
1977 deaths
20th-century French painters
20th-century French male artists
French male painters
Olympic competitors in art competitions
People from Limoges